Apple Pioneer Place is an Apple Store, a retail outlet of Apple Inc., in downtown Portland, Oregon.

See also
 George Floyd mural

References

External links
 

Apple Inc.
Buildings and structures in Portland, Oregon
Southwest Portland, Oregon